NGC 2100 is an open cluster in the Large Magellanic Cloud, a small satellite galaxy of the Milky Way. These clusters have a lifespan measured in tens or hundreds of millions of years, as they eventually disperse through gravitational interaction with other bodies. As its format is approximately round, it is sometimes mistaken as a globular cluster.

References

External links
 

Open clusters
Large Magellanic Cloud
2100
Dorado (constellation)